Incite is an American groove/thrash metal band from Phoenix, Arizona, formed in 2004. The band currently consists of Richie Cavalera (vocals), Christopher "EL" Elsten (bass), Lennon Lopez (drums) and Mike DeLeon (guitar). Frontman Richie Cavalera is best known as the stepson of Max Cavalera, formerly of Sepultura and currently a member of the bands Soulfly and Cavalera Conspiracy.

Incite have released two EPs, Murder (2006) and Divided We Fail (2007), and six full-length albums, The Slaughter (2009), the Logan Mader-produced All Out War (2012), Up in Hell (2014), Oppression (2016), Built to Destroy (2019) and Wake Up Dead (2022). The band is currently signed to Minus Head Records.

History 
Incite was formed in late 2004. After gigging in the local area with Richie appearing on Soulfly's album Dark Ages and Cavalera Conspiracy's Inflikted, the quartet released an EP in 2007 entitled Divided We Fail, with track "Army of Darkness" being the first track posted by the group on MySpace. 2007 also saw an overhaul of the original Incite lineup with Richie Cavalera the sole remaining original member as he sought to make the group more professional. 2009 saw the release of début LP The Slaughter and tours supporting groups such as Soulfly and The Dillinger Escape Plan, however soon the group parted ways with their record label.

After the group signed a deal with minus HEAD records, they began working on their sophomore effort All Out War, which was eventually released on November 20, 2012. The album was produced by former Machine Head and Soulfly guitarist Logan Mader, and has been supported by the Maximum Cavalera Tour, with Soulfly (fronted by Richie's stepfather Max Cavalera) and Lody Kong (consisting of Richie's half brothers Zyon and Igor). During this time, guitarist Dis left the band and was replaced by Gene Macazan. The song Die Alone was released as a free download by SkullsNBones on November 15, 2012. A music video for the song Hopeless was released on November 29.

Drummer Zak Sofaly, bassist Luis Marrufo and guitarist Gene Macazan left Incite in 2013 for personal reasons. They were replaced by Derek Lopez, Christopher "EL" elsten and Dru Rome respectively; this lineup recorded the band's next three albums Up in Hell (2014), Oppression (2016) and Built to Destroy (2019). Shortly after the release of Built to Destroy, Rome was replaced by Eli Santana.

On January 20, 2022, the band announced that their sixth album, titled Wake Up Dead, would be released on March 25. The album's release date was later postponed to April 8, 2022, because of manufacturing issues.

Members 

Current lineup
Richie Cavalera – vocals (2004–present)
Christopher "EL" Elsten – bass (2013–present)
Derek Lennon Lopez – drums, percussion (2013–present)
Mike DeLeon – guitars (2022–present)

Former members
Eli Santana – guitars (2019–2022)
Dru "tang" Rome – rhythm guitar (2013–2019), lead guitar (2016–2019)
Brandon Brimhall – bass (2004–2007)
Matt Merisola – drums (2004–2007)
David Busch – lead guitar (2004–2007)
Nathan Bond – rhythm guitar (2004–2007)
Zak Sofaly – drums (2007–2013)
Kevin "Dis" McAllister – lead guitar (2007–2012, 2013–2016), rhythm guitar (2007–2012)
Luis Marrufo – bass (2007–2013)
Gene Macazan – guitars (2012–2013)

Touring members
Kieran Agnew – guitars (2020)
Ashley Currie – guitars (2020)

Timeline

Discography 

Studio albums
The Slaughter (2009)
All Out War (2012)
Up in Hell (2014)
Oppression (2016)
Built to Destroy (2019)
Wake Up Dead (2022)

EPs
Murder (2006)
Divided We Fail (2008)

Music videos
 "Divided We Fail" (2008)
 "Hopeless" (2012)
 "Fallen" (2014)
 "WTF" (2014)
 "No Remorse" (2016)
 "Stagnant" (2016)
 "Built to Destroy" (2018)
 "Resistance" (2019)

References

External links

American groove metal musical groups
Musical groups established in 2004
Musical groups from Phoenix, Arizona
Musical quartets
Heavy metal musical groups from Arizona